The Searcy Confederate Monument stands on the grounds of the White County Courthouse, near the corner of West Arch Avenue and Spring Streets, in Searcy, Arkansas. It is a marble statue, depicting a Confederate Army soldier, standing at rest with his rifle resting on the ground. The base is inscribed in commemoration of White County's soldiers who served in the Confederate Army. The statue was placed in 1917; it was funded through a public fund-raising campaign.

The monument was listed on the National Register of Historic Places in 1996.

See also
National Register of Historic Places listings in White County, Arkansas

References

Buildings and structures completed in 1917
Confederate States of America monuments and memorials in Arkansas
Monuments and memorials on the National Register of Historic Places in Arkansas
National Register of Historic Places in Searcy, Arkansas
Neoclassical architecture in Arkansas
Tourist attractions in White County, Arkansas
1917 establishments in Arkansas